Pop Wea, also known as Lori Tanner, Lorie Tanner, Lo Ree Tanner, Lo Rie Tanner, Loree Tanner and Lo Rei Tanner (died 1966), was a Native American artist associated with the Taos Pueblo. She was a painter and potter. Pop Wea is listed in the Biographical Directory of Native American Painters, and in American Indian Painters: a Biographical Directory.

Work
Pop Wea's work titled Taos Warrior Dance (casein on board) is on display at the Arizona State Museum at the University of Arizona. Her work has been described as dramatic and non-traditional, for example her work Buffalo in snow. Her paintings were sometimes executed in a "three dimensional style." In 1965, her work Eagle Dance received first prize in painting in the Scottsdale Indian Art Exhibition; it was described in a review as having "startling calligraphy on a black ground."

Pop Wea's work was exhibited in 1962 at the Museum of Northern Arizona, and at the Heard Museum in 1967.

Pop Wea has been described as a "promising artist who died young." Pop Wea's reputation as an artist was established in 1963 following an exhibition in Gallup, New Mexico; she unexpectedly died three years later.

Collections
Pop Wea's work is in the James T. Bialac Collection of Southwest Paintings at the Arizona State Museum. Her work is included in several private collections.

Personal life
Pop Wea was the niece of another Taos Pueblo artist, Pop Chalee.

References

Further reading 
 Nickens, P; Nickens, K. Pueblo Indians of New Mexico, Charleston, SC: Arcadia Publishing, 2008. 

1966 deaths
American women ceramists
American ceramists
American women painters
Native American painters
Painters from New Mexico
Taos Pueblo artists
Year of birth missing
Native American women artists
20th-century American painters
20th-century ceramists
20th-century American women artists
20th-century Native Americans
20th-century Native American women